The Lebanon national futsal team represents Lebanon in international futsal competitions. Nicknamed "the Cedars", the team is controlled by the Lebanese Football Association (LFA).

Lebanon has yet to participate in the FIFA Futsal World Cup; their closest attempt came in 2021, when they lost to Vietnam in the play-offs on the away goals rule. Lebanon are regulars at the AFC Futsal Asian Cup, reaching the quarter-finals on seven occasions. The team also competes in the WAFF Futsal Championship, where they came second in the first edition, and the Arab Futsal Championship, coming in third place twice.

Competitive record

FIFA Futsal World Cup

AMF Futsal World Cup

AFC Futsal Asian Cup

Asian Indoor and Martial Arts Games

WAFF Futsal Championship

Arab Futsal Cup

Mediterranean Futsal Cup

Players

Current squad
The following players were called up for the 2022 WAFF Futsal Championship.

Previous squads

AFC Futsal Championship
2018 AFC Futsal Championship squads

References

Asian national futsal teams
Futsal in Lebanon
Futsal